Harold Kile Claypool (June 2, 1886 – August 2, 1958) was a U.S. Representative from Ohio, son of Horatio Clifford Claypool and cousin of John Barney Peterson.

Born in Bainbridge, Ross County, Ohio, Claypool attended the public schools and Ohio State University at Columbus. He engaged in the publishing business at Columbus, Ohio, and published Hunter and Trader Magazine. He was deputy probate judge of Ross County, Ohio.

Claypool was elected as a Democrat to the Seventy-fifth, Seventy-sixth, and Seventy-seventh Congresses (January 3, 1937 – January 3, 1943). He was an unsuccessful candidate for reelection in 1942 to the Seventy-eighth Congress. He resumed the publishing and office supply business. He served as United States marshal for the southern district of Ohio from 1944 to 1953.

Claypool died in Chillicothe, Ohio, on August 2, 1958. He was interred in Grandview Cemetery, Chillicothe, Ross County, Ohio, USA.

Sources 

1886 births
1958 deaths
People from Bainbridge, Ross County, Ohio
Ohio State University alumni
Burials at Grandview Cemetery (Chillicothe, Ohio)

Democratic Party members of the United States House of Representatives from Ohio

United States Marshals
20th-century American politicians